The 1983 Oklahoma Sooners football team represented the University of Oklahoma during the 1983 NCAA Division I-A football season. They played their home games at Oklahoma Memorial Stadium and competed as members of the Big Eight Conference. They were led by head coach Barry Switzer.

Schedule

Personnel

Season summary

at Stanford

#6 Ohio State

Tulsa

at Kansas State

vs. Texas

at Oklahoma State

Marcus Dupree left team during the week

Iowa State

Kansas

at Missouri

Colorado

Nebraska

at Hawaii

Rankings

Postseason

NFL draft
The following players were drafted into the National Football League following the season.

References

Oklahoma
Oklahoma Sooners football seasons
Oklahoma Sooners football